Lawrence S. Young is professor of molecular oncology at the University of Warwick and director of the Warwick Cancer Research Centre.

He has an h-index of 109 according to Google Scholar.

References

Year of birth missing (living people)
Living people
Academics of the University of Warwick
Academics of the University of Birmingham
Place of birth missing (living people)